Tropiocolotes yomtovi is a species of gecko of the genus Tropiocolotes. It is found in Israel, Egypt, Jordan, and Saudi Arabia.

References

yomtovi
Reptiles described in 2022